Etienne Emmanuel Eto'o Fils (born 17 March 1990) is a Cameroonian professional footballer who last played as a striker for Erste Liga club FC Lustenau in 2012.

Club career
Eto'o began his career with Real Mallorca and has also played on loan for S.D. La Salle in 2007, after six months turned back to Real Mallorca. After several years with RCD Mallorca was released in summer 2009 and signed on 1 December 2009 for Gimnàstic de Tarragona, but on 11 January 2010 left his club on loan to CF Pobla de Mafumet.

In August 2011 he signed a one-year contract at FC Lustenau in Austria. At his first appearance he scored a goal only two minutes after his substitution. In February 2012 he left the club.

International career
He represented Africa in the 2007 Meridian Cup.

Personal life
He is the younger brother of striker Samuel Eto'o. He also has another older brother, David Eto'o. He also holds a Spanish passport.

References

External links
Futbolme profile 

1989 births
Living people
Cameroonian footballers
Cameroonian expatriate footballers
Cameroonian emigrants to Spain
Association football forwards
Cameroonian expatriate sportspeople in Spain
Cameroonian expatriate sportspeople in Portugal
RCD Mallorca players
CF Pobla de Mafumet footballers
Expatriate footballers in Spain
Expatriate footballers in Austria
Kadji Sports Academy players
Cameroonian expatriates in Austria
2. Liga (Austria) players